Guild Theatre may refer to:

 August Wilson Theatre, formerly Guild Theatre, Broadway, Manhattan, New York
 Guild Theatre, Melbourne, at the University of Melbourne
Guild Theatre (Portland, Oregon)